Phouoibi or Phouoipi may refer to:
 Phouoibi, the Meitei goddess of bounty.
 Phouoibi Shayon, a Meitei mythological feature film. 
 Phou-oibi, the rice goddess, a Meitei ballad opera.